An ambush on the Algerian paramilitary took place on June 17, 2009, at 8:00 pm (19:00 GMT), when Algerian paramilitary escorting Chinese construction workers to a motorway project came under attack from Islamist rebels. Early reports suggested 18 soldiers were killed; some news outlets are reporting that 24 soldiers were killed.

Attacks such as these had been thought to be decreasing prior to the incident, but suddenly began to increase again. The attack was the deadliest aimed at Algeria's government forces for six months.

The ambush 
The gendarmes were then sprayed with bullets. Attackers then reportedly stole the soldiers' uniforms and weapons. Total rebel casualties are unknown. The injured soldiers were taken to nearby hospitals. They stole weapons and several police vehicles.

Algerian security forces  launched an operation using helicopters to track and apprehend the militants.

Similar incident 
This ambush followed a similar incident on 3 June 2009. Two teachers and eight police escorts died near Algiers whilst in the act of transporting examinations from an examination centre. The teachers' car was bombed and two police cars were fired on.

On 20 April 2014, a similar ambush lead to death of 14 Soldiers in the Tizi Ouzou province of Algeria.

See also
 Terrorist bombings in Algeria

References

External links 
Recent history of armed attacks in Algeria

Mass murder in 2009
Deaths by firearm in Algeria
June 2009 crimes
Military history of Algeria
2009 murders in Algeria